The Sixteenth Canadian Ministry was the third cabinet chaired by Prime Minister William Lyon Mackenzie King.  It governed Canada from 23 October 1935 to 15 November 1948, including all of the 18th and 19th Canadian Parliaments, as well as the beginning of the 20th.  The government was formed by the Liberal Party of Canada.  Mackenzie King was also Prime Minister in the Twelfth and Fourteenth Canadian Ministries.

Ministers

References

Succession

16
Ministries of George V
Ministries of Edward VIII
Ministries of George VI
1935 establishments in Canada
1948 disestablishments in Canada
Cabinets established in 1935
Cabinets disestablished in 1948